Madurawelage Don Udara Supeksha Jayasundera (born 3 January 1991), more commonly known as Udara Jayasundera, is a Sri Lankan Test cricketer. He is a left-handed batsman and an occasional legbreak bowler. He is a past student of Ananda College, Colombo.

Career
Jayasundera played for Sri Lanka Board President's XI in a tour match against West Indians in October 2015, top scoring with 142 runs.

He made his Test debut on 10 December 2015 against New Zealand. He had a poor debut in the match, where he was only able to score a single run in the first innings and 3 runs in the second innings. Sri Lanka lost the match by 122 runs at the end.

In November 2021, he was selected to play for the Kandy Warriors following the players' draft for the 2021 Lanka Premier League.

References

External links
 

1991 births
Living people
Sri Lankan cricketers
Sri Lanka Test cricketers
People from Western Province, Sri Lanka
Galle Guardians cricketers
Mannar District cricketers
Nagenahira Nagas cricketers